Schemmel is a surname. Notable people with the surname include: 

Jerry Schemmel (born 1959), American sportscaster
Sean Schemmel, American voice actor, ADR director and screenwriter
Sébastien Schemmel (born 1975), French footballer

Surnames of German origin